Loudéac (Gallo: Loudia) is a commune in the Côtes-d'Armor department, Brittany, northwestern France.

Geography

Climate
Loudéac has a oceanic climate (Köppen climate classification Cfb).

Population

The inhabitants of Loudéac are known in French as Loudéaciens and  Loudéaciennes.

Notable people

Éon de l'Étoile
Pape Sy, basketball player
Penda Sy, basketball player

Sport

Loudéac has 2 football teams, FC Saint-Bugan, named after an area in the town, and Loudéac OSC, formed from the amalgamation of Stade Loudéacien (1909) and Avenir Sportif Loudéacien (1966) on june 1, 2001. Loudéac OSC is traditionally a big club on the amateur scene in the region (being one of the larger towns). Recently, the club has restructured with a strong policy on developing youth, which has paid dividends as the club are again rising through the divisions. There is also a female team within the club.
There is a handball team in the town, l'Amicale Laîque Loudéac Handball who compete across male and female senior and junior competition.
A rugby team based in the town is named the Loup'déaciens (a play on words on the word 'loup' which means 'wolf' in French.
There is a strong local pool scene, which has culminated in a youth based in the town becoming a world champion at youth level as part of a French team.

See also
 Communes of the Côtes-d'Armor department

References

External links

 Official website 
 

Communes of Côtes-d'Armor
Côtes-d'Armor communes articles needing translation from French Wikipedia